Bocula quadrilineata is a moth of the family Erebidae first described by Francis Walker in 1858. It is found in Borneo.

References

Rivulinae